You Jae-Sook (born 15 March 1968) is a former field hockey player for South Korea, who won the silver medal with the women's national team at the 1996 Summer Olympics in Atlanta, USA.

References

External links
 

1968 births
Living people
South Korean female field hockey players
Female field hockey goalkeepers
Olympic field hockey players of South Korea
Field hockey players at the 1992 Summer Olympics
Field hockey players at the 1996 Summer Olympics
Olympic silver medalists for South Korea
Olympic medalists in field hockey
Medalists at the 1996 Summer Olympics
Asian Games medalists in field hockey
Field hockey players at the 1990 Asian Games
Field hockey players at the 1994 Asian Games
Asian Games gold medalists for South Korea
Medalists at the 1990 Asian Games
Medalists at the 1994 Asian Games
20th-century South Korean women
21st-century South Korean women